Beltrum is a village in the region called Achterhoek in the province of Gelderland in the Netherlands.

Religion 
Most people of the village belong to the catholic parish 'Onze Lieve Vrouwe ten Hemelopneming' which was founded with the building of a parish church in 1853. Before they were mainly oriented at the catholic Calixtus church, the former catholic church in Groenlo.

Politics 
Before the 18th century Beltrum was part of the Stad en Heerlijkheid of Borculo. From about 1795 until 1819 it was an independent municipality. After this short independent period it became a hamlet and part of Eibergen. Today Beltrum belongs to the municipality of Berkelland.

Sports 
Sports in Beltrum is organized in community clubs. The biggest of them is the 'Sportcentrale VIOS', a federation of Beltrum sports clubs with member clubs that are active in soccer, gymnastics, handball, volleyball, table tennis or tug-of-war. Besides VIOS there is a tennis club and a sports rifle club.

Export products
Beneath the biggest wooden shoe factory of Europe, Beltrum's export products are dweilorkest Valse Loch and the coverrockband Aftershock. Beltrum is also famous by the yearly organized survival run in January with hundreds of competitors. And the annual Dahliacorso, on the first Sunday of September.

Gallery

References 

Ad van der Meer and Onno Boonstra, "Repertorium van Nederlandse gemeenten", KNAW, 2006. 

Populated places in Gelderland
Former municipalities of Gelderland
Berkelland